Joachim Christoph Friedrich von Jeetze (16 September 1673 in Hohenwulsch in der Altmark– 11  September 1752 in Potsdam) was the Field Marshal of Frederick the Great.

Joachim Christoph Friedrich was the son of Joachim Parum von Jeetze (died 9 February 1709 in Büste) and his wife, Dorothea Elisabeth (née  von Vinzelberg) (2 May 1650– 1 February 1692).

On 13. Mai 1708 Jeetze married Dorothea Sophie von Borstell (18 June 1689 in Groß Schwarzlosen–28 May 1759 in Stendal). They had 4 sons and 2 daughters, one of whom died in infancy.  The sons were all soldiers.

Philipp Wilhelm ( 27  February 1709 in Groß Schwarzlosen; † 28. Mai 1759), Prussian captain.
Karl Wilhelm (1  Juli 1710 in Manuta;† 7. Mai 1753 in Berlin), Prussian colonel  ∞ Sophia Dorothea von Einsiedel, die Tochter von Gottfried Emanuel von Einsiedel
Friedrich Wilhelm (* 24. November 1711 in St. Crossete bei Parma; † 18. März 1776 in Stendal), captain ∞ 27. Januar *Sophie von Hake aus dem Hause Großkreutz († 10. Januar 1806)
Wilhelm Leopold (* 7. Mai 1717 auf Hohenwulsch; † 1722)
Sophia Hedwig (* 6. März 1714; † a few days later)

References

1673 births
1752 deaths
People from Bismark, Germany
Field marshals of Prussia
Military personnel from Saxony-Anhalt